The Deutsche Reichsbahn, also known as the German National Railway, the German State Railway, German Reich Railway, and the German Imperial Railway, was the German national railway system created after the end of World War I from the regional railways of the individual states of the German Empire. The Deutsche Reichsbahn has been described as "the largest enterprise in the capitalist world in the years between 1920 and 1932"; nevertheless its importance "arises primarily from the fact that the Reichsbahn was at the center of events in a period of great turmoil in German history".

Overview 
In 1937 the railway was reorganised again as a state authority and given the name  ("German Imperial Railway", DRB).

The East and West German states were founded in 1949. The Austrian  ("Austrian Federal Railways", ÖBB) was founded in 1945, and was given its present name in 1947.

In January 1994, following German reunification, the East German  merged with the West German  to form Germany's new national carrier,  ("German Rail", DBAG), technically no longer a government agency but still a 100% state-owned joint stock company.

Deutsche Reichseisenbahnen (1920–1924) 
The first railways to be owned by the German Empire, which was founded in 1871, were the Imperial Railways in Alsace-Lorraine, whose Imperial General Division of Railways in Alsace-Lorraine had its headquarters in Straßburg (now Strasbourg). It was formed after France had ceded the territory of Alsace-Lorraine in 1871 to the German Empire and the newly created Third French Republic had formally purchased the French Eastern Railway Company ( or ) and then sold it again to the German Empire. After the end of the First World War this national "imperial railway" was taken back by France.

In the remaining German states, by contrast, the existing state railways continued to be subject to their respective sovereigns, despite the fact that Otto von Bismarck had tried in vain to purchase the main railway lines for the Empire. A similar attempt failed in 1875 as a result of opposition from the middle powers when Albert von Maybach presented a draft Reich Railway Act to the Bundesrat.

This resulted in the merger of the existing state railways of Prussia, Bavaria, Saxony, Württemberg, Baden, Mecklenburg and Oldenburg under the newly formed German Reich. The state railways that merged were the:

 Baden state railways
 Mecklenburg state railways
 Oldenburg state railways
 Bavarian state railways
 Saxon state railways
 Württemberg state railways
 Prussian-Hessian state railways

In 1922 the old railway divisions were renamed as Reich railway divisions.

Deutsche Reichsbahn-Gesellschaft (1924–1937) 

Among the provisions of the 1924 Dawes Plan was a plan to utilize the state railway completely for the payment of war reparations. Following the plan's publication, on 12 February 1924, the Reich government announced the creation of the Deutsche Reichsbahn as a state enterprise under the Reich Ministry of Transport.

As this was not enough to satisfy the reparations creditors, on 30 August 1924 a law was enacted providing for the establishment of a state-owned  ("German Imperial Railway Company", DRG) as a public holding company to operate the national railways. The aim was to earn profits which, under the Dawes Plan, were to be used to contribute to Germany's war reparations.

At the same time as the Reichsbahn law was enacted, the company was handed a bill of eleven billion Goldmarks to be paid to the Allied powers, while its original capital was valued at fifteen billion Goldmarks. These terms were later amended in the Young Plan. Nevertheless, the Great Depression and the regular payment of war reparations (about 660 million Reichsmarks annually) put a considerable strain on the Reichsbahn. Not until the Lausanne Conference of 1932 was the Reichsbahn released from its financial obligations. In total, about 3.87 billion Goldmarks was paid in reparations to the Allied powers.

During the DRG period the following milestones occurred:

 1 October 1930: the DRG took over the Bremen Port Railway
 1 March 1935: the railways of the Saar were incorporated

The beginning of the DRG was characterised by the acquisition of new rolling stock built to standard types, such as the standard steam locomotives. The stock already in use had been inherited from the various state railways and comprised a great number of designs, many of them quite old. In fact, the DRG was unable to procure new stock in the numbers it wanted to both for financial reasons and due to delays in upgrading the lines to carry higher axle loads. The locomotive classes taken over from the old state railways, especially those from the Prussia, continued to dominate the scene until the end of the 1930s. They included, for example, the Prussian P 8 (BR 38.10-40), Prussian P 10 (BR 39), Prussian G 12 (BR 58.10) and the Prussian T 20 (BR 95). The Bavarian S 3/6 (BR 18.5) express locomotive even continued in production until 1930.

Not until the procurement programme for the wartime  were new goods locomotives built in large numbers, but of course now for a very different purpose.

Taking lead from the German Labor Front, the Deutsche Reichsbahn took part in the conflict of intermarriage in Germany. In August 1933 Robert Ley, leader of Reich Labor, demanded that those administrators working for the German Labor Front be married only to German individuals. The Deutsche Reichsbahn took the lead in discriminating against intermarried workers, firing German employees married to Jews and forbidding intermarried Germans from working there in the future, starting in November 1933.

In the latter part of the 1930s, the development of high-speed trains like the "Flying Hamburger" was accelerated. Before that streamlined steam engines had been built, but they were not as economical as the high-speed diesel and electric railcars. Although the Borsig streamlined steam engine, the no. 05 002 reached a speed of  during a demonstration run, the Reichsbahn preferred fast railcars on its high speed network.

Before the Second World War the most important railway lines ran in an east–west direction. The high-speed lines at that time were on the Prussian Eastern Railway which ran through the Polish corridor (albeit slower there due to the poor state of the tracks), the lines from Berlin to Hamburg, via Hanover to the Ruhrgebiet, via Frankfurt am Main to southwest Germany, on which the diesel express trains ran, and the Silesian Railway from Berlin to Breslau (now Wrocław).

Bavarian Group Administration 
Within the state of Bavaria, the Bavarian Group Administration had its head office and was largely independent by § III 14 of the DRG's company regulations. It was responsible for the electrification of many lines, following the commencement of electric power generation to the railways at the Walchensee Power Plant, and for the independent trialling and procurement of locomotives and passenger coaches. The Group Administration introduced, for example, the Class E 32 locomotive and Class ET 85 railcar into service.

Bavaria also continued to use its own signalling system for many years after the merger.

In 1933 the Group Administration was disbanded and administration of the railways in Bavaria was taken over by the Deutsche Reichsbahn.

Leadership of the Reichsbahn 
At the head of the Reichsbahn was a director general. The office holders were:

 1924–1926 Rudolf Oeser
 1926–1945 Julius Dorpmüller

From 1925, the director general had a permanent deputy. These were:
 1925–1926 Julius Dorpmüller
 1926–1933 Wilhelm Weirauch
 1933–1942 Wilhelm Kleinmann
 1942–1945 Albert Ganzenmüller

As a result of the Reichsbahn Act of 11 July 1939, the Reich Transport Minister became the director general of the Reichsbahn by his office. Dorpmüller, who since 1937 was also in charge of the Reich Ministry of Transport, continued in office as the director general after 1939 under this new legal framework.

Deutsche Reichsbahn (1937–1945) 

World War II and military use 
The  had an important logistic role in supporting the rapid movement of the troops of the Wehrmacht, for example:
 March 1938: the annexation of Austria (Anschluss) and
 October 1938: the annexation of the Sudetenland after the Munich Agreement
 March 1939: the German occupation of Czechoslovakia
 September/October 1939: the invasion of Poland
 April 1940: Operation Weserübung (the invasions of Denmark and Norway)
 May/June 1940: the Battle of France
 1941: Operation Barbarossa and the Balkan Campaign.

In all the occupied lands the Reichsbahn  endeavoured to incorporate the  captured  railways (rolling stock and infrastructure) into their system. Even towards the end of the war the Reichsbahn continued to move military formations. For example, in the last great offensive, the Battle of the Bulge (from 16 December 1944), tank formations were transported from Hungary to the Ardennes.

In the campaigns against Poland, Denmark, France, Yugoslavia, Greece etc. the newly acquired standard gauge networks could be used without difficulty. By contrast, after the start of the invasion of Russia on 22 June 1941, the problem arose of transferring troops and materiel to Soviet broad gauge lines or converting them to German standard gauge. Confounding German plans, the Red Army and Soviet railways managed to withdraw or destroy the majority of its rolling stock during its retreat. As a result, German standard gauge rolling stock had to be used for an additional logistic role within Russia; this required the laying of standard gauge track.

During the war, locomotives in the war zones were sometimes given camouflage livery. In addition, locomotives were painted with the  symbol (the eagle, Germany's traditional symbol of national sovereignty) holding a swastika. On goods wagons the name "" was replaced by the letters "DR". Postal coaches continued to bear the name "".

The preparations for the invasion of Russia saw the greatest troop deployment by rail in history.

Expansion 
This affected both parts of foreign state railways (in Austria the entire state railway) in the countries annexed by the Deutsche Reich, as well as private railways in Germany and in other countries:

Holocaust 

The logistics of the Reichsbahn were also an important factor during the Holocaust. Jews were transported like cattle to the concentration and extermination camps by the Deutsche Reichsbahn in trains of covered goods wagons, now known as Holocaust trains. These movements using cattle wagons from the goods station of the great Frankfurt Market Hall, for example, thus played a significant role in the genocide within the extermination machinery of the Holocaust. In 1997, the market erected a memorial plaque in recognition of this dark period of history.

The following is an excerpt from the testimony of Holocaust scholar Raul Hilberg:

Conditions in the wagons were inhumane because no water or food was provided, and sanitary arrangements were minimal, usually a bucket in a corner of the wagon. Although each wagon was intended to hold about 50 people, they were frequently overcrowded and holding 100 to 150 people. No heating was provided, so people could freeze in winter and overheat in summer. Deaths in the wagons were frequent among the young, old, sick, and disabled, especially as travel was slow and often lasted many days since the trains had low priority on the tracks. Their small amount of luggage was stored separately, sometimes at the station and never left with the train, but examined for valuables which were stolen or resold for profit.

A certain amount of controversy has surrounded the train's tour through Germany, in part because of the apparent lack of cooperation on the part of  AG (DB AG) concerning such matters as compensation for the use of the DB AG's right of way (during the tour) and the stationing of the train, during its visit to Berlin, at the  station instead of the more centrally located  main railway station. The tour was scheduled to end on 8 May 2008 (the 63rd anniversary of the end of the European portion of World War II) when the train arrived at Auschwitz. However, it continued to make appearances through 2009, and as of January 2010 the website requests visitors to look for further travel plans at the end of February.

Rebuilding after 1945
German railways were heavily bombed by Allied RAF and USAAF bombers. Marshalling yards, bridges, repair shops, and service facilities were all destroyed. Fighter-bombers targeted locomotives and bombed them. As a result, trains were at a stand still in the Spring of 1945. The cities of Hamburg, Munich, Nuremberg, Frankfort, Dusseldorf, Berlin, Leipzig, Dresden and others were affected. Stations were completely destroyed and wagons and carriage set on fire and destroyed. Bomb craters and blast seriously damaged the permanent way or rail track. The Allied forces of Occupation were put in charge and instantly had myriad problems regarding food, lack of housing, fuel, displaced persons and people on the move. 

The Engineering Corps of British and American forces oversaw the partial rebuilding of the lines and cars with local labour from Prisoners-of-War, rubble women, and de-mobilized soldiers. Temporary wooden bridges were put up over destroyed spans. Multiple tracks were disassembled into one smaller working line, equipment assessed  and rebuilt. In three months, the railway was working again in a rudimentary form. The Armies of Occupation needed the railways to move coal and the soon to be gathered agricultural harvest. Deutschebahn had a critical shortage of wagons, carriages and locomotives, so much so that the US gave war surplus engines to ensure the movement of freight.

Breakup of the Reichsbahn 
With the end of the Second World War in 1945 those parts of the Deutsche Reichsbahn that were outside the new German borders laid down in the Potsdam Agreement were transferred to the ownership and administration of the states in whose territory they were situated. For example, on 27 April 1945, the Austrian railways became independent again as the Austrian State Railway ( or ÖStB), later renamed as the Austrian Federal Railways ( or ÖBB) on 5 August 1947.

Railways in the occupation zones 
Operational control of the rest of the DR was devolved to the respective zones of occupation so that the  legally existed in four parts until 1949.

US Zone 
In the American Zone the Reichsbahn divisions of Augsburg, Frankfurt am Main, Kassel, Munich, Regensburg and Stuttgart (for the railways in Württemberg-Baden) were subordinated to the Senior Control Office US Zone in Frankfurt.

British Zone 

French Zone 
In the French Occupation Zone, the railways were grouped into the Operating Association of the Southwest German Railways with its headquarters in Speyer. The Operating Association included the railway divisions of Karlsruhe (in the US Zone), Mainz and Saarbrücken. After the Saarland was transferred from the French Zone and was given its own state railway – the Railways of the Saarland – the rest of the network of the Saarbrücken division went into the new Trier division. After the Deutsche Bundesbahn was formed this Operating Association was merged with it.

Soviet Zone 
The Soviet zone of occupation became a self-declared socialist state, the German Democratic Republic (commonly known as East Germany), on 7 October 1949.

On the formation of East Germany on 7 October 1949, the railway system in the Soviet Zone retained the name  (DR), despite the connotations of the word "Reich".

Bizone and creation of the DB 
To conform to the formation of the Bizone in 1946 the Head Office of the Railways of the American and British Occupation Regions was created. Following the foundation of the Federal Republic of Germany, it was renamed Deutsche Bundesbahn.

East German Deutsche Reichsbahn 

In the post-war years, the DR in East Germany continued to develop independently of the DB, but very much in parallel. The locomotive classification scheme, based on that of the DRG, was extended. The production, conversion and development of steam locomotives initially continued in earnest; older, especially ex- classes being rationalised and withdrawn from service. A major conversion programme to update steam locomotives and rectify flawed, mainly wartime austerity, classes was carried out in the 1950s. Gradually, however, they were replaced by the more economical and easier-to-maintain diesel and electric classes. In general this happened rather later than in the West. In 1970, the DR renumbered its locomotives in order to conform to new computerised data standards.

On 3 October 1990, the GDR states acceded to the Federal Republic of Germany. Initially the two railway administrations continued to operate separately, albeit with increasing cooperation, and in 1994 they were merged to form the new Deutsche Bahn.

See also 

 Breitspurbahn
 Deutsche Reichsbahn service ranks
 DRG locomotive classification
 DRG locomotive types
 German steam locomotive classification
 List of DRG locomotives and railcars
 Rail transport in Germany
 Railway sabotage during World War II
 Shoah (film)
 Transportation in Germany
 Bahnschutzpolizei

References

Sources 
 Roland Beier, Hans Sternhart: Deutsche Reichsbahn in Österreich 1938–1945 (–1953). Internationales Archiv für Lokomotivgeschichte Vol 14, Slezak, Wien, 1999, 
 Alfred C. Mierzejewski: The Most Valuable Asset of the Reich: A History of the German National Railway.
 Vol 1: 1920–1932, Chapel Hill und London, The University of North Carolina Press 1999
 Vol 2: 1933–1945, Chapel Hill und London, The University of North Carolina Press 2000
 Lothar Gall and Manfred Pohl: Die Eisenbahn in Deutschland. Von den Anfängen bis zur Gegenwart. Verlag C. H. Beck, Munich, 1999

External links 
 Law on the Deutsche Reichsbahn-Gesellschaft (Reichsbahn law)
 By-laws of the Deutsche Reichsbahn-Gesellschaft
 Law on the reorganization of the circumstances of the Reichsbank and the Deutsche Reichsbahn
 

History of rail transport in Germany
Defunct railway companies of Germany
Railway companies established in 1920
Railway companies disestablished in 1949
Deutsche Reichsbahn-Gesellschaft locomotives
1949 disestablishments in Germany
Companies involved in the Holocaust
German companies established in 1920